

Station List

Ma

Me

Mi

Mo-Mt

Mu

My

M